Alec Wintering (born April 26, 1995) is an American basketball player for Real Valladolid of the LEB Oro.

College career
Wintering played four seasons of college basketball with the Portland Pilots. He averaged 14.1 points and 5.2 assists in 110 games with the Pilots.

Professional career

Araberri (2017–2018) 
In September 2017, Wintering signed a one-year contract with Araberri BC of the Spanish LEB Oro.

Dutch Windmills (2018–2019) 
On August 1, 2018, Wintering was announced by Dutch Windmills of the Dutch Basketball League (DBL). In October 21, he suffered an injury which included a broken fibula. In January, he returned to the starting line up.  On 10 April 2019, Windmills withdrew from the DBL due to its financial problems.

CB Peñas Huesca (2019–2020) 
On December 21, 2019, he has signed with Huesca of the LEB Oro.

Melilla (2020–2021)
In July 2020, Wintering signed with Melilla of the LEB Oro.

Real Valladolid (2021–present)
On July 19, 2021, he has signed with Real Valladolid Baloncesto of the LEB Oro.

References

External links
Portland bio

1995 births
Living people
American expatriate basketball people in the Netherlands
American expatriate basketball people in Spain
American men's basketball players
Araberri BC players
Basketball players from Charlotte, North Carolina
CB Valladolid players
Dutch Basketball League players
Dutch Windmills players
CB Peñas Huesca players
Club Melilla Baloncesto players
Point guards
Portland Pilots men's basketball players